Quilmes is a partido of Buenos Aires Province, Argentina, within the Gran Buenos Aires conurbation.

Named after the Quilmes Tribe, its capital is the city of Quilmes.

Beer

Quilmes gives its name to one of Argentina's beers, Cerveza Quilmes, which was originally brewed in the area.

Sport
Quilmes is home to two football clubs, Quilmes Atlético Club of the Primera Division and Club Atlético Argentino de Quilmes of the regionalised 5th Division. The city also stands out in many other sports, including field hockey, basketball and rugby, among others.

Christianity
In 1666 was established the Cathedral of Quilmes (Catedral de Quilmes in Spanish). In 1976 a papal bull created the Diócesis de Quilmes. The first minister was Padre Obispo Jorge Novak, famous for his defense of Human Rights during the Proceso de Reorganización Nacional.

The first Rivers of Life Church ("Ríos de Vida" in Spanish) was established in Quilmes in 1967. It is a group of over 80 evangelical churches around the world. Rivers of Life, Quilmes has the largest congregation of all the Rivers of Life churches around the world.

Other notable evangelical churches include the Iglesia del Encuentro and the Iglesia del Puente.

Districts (localidades)

References

External links

 

 
Partidos of Buenos Aires Province
1812 establishments in Argentina

sr:Килмес